Calectasia browneana, commonly known as blue tinsel lily, is a plant in the family Dasypogonaceae growing as a spreading, perennial, tufted herb. It is an uncommon species, endemic and restricted to a few areas in the south-west of Western Australia. It is similar to the other species of Calectasia and has only been recognised as a separate species since a review of the genus in 2001. It is distinguished from the others mainly by the hairiness of its leaves and lack of a rhizome.

Description
Calectasia browneana is an undershrub with stilt roots but without a rhizome. It grows to a height of about 60 cm with many very short side branches. Each leaf blade is 8.3–15.2 x 0.2–0.4 mm tapering to a short, sharp point on the end and densely covered with fine hairs. The base of the petals (strictly tepals) form a tube 7.2–8.0 mm long, while the outer parts spread outwards to form a pale blue-pink, papery star-like pattern. In the centre of the star are six yellow stamens forming a tube which turns orange-red with age. The thin style extends beyond the stamens. Flowers appear from June to August.

Taxonomy and naming
Calectasia browneana is one of eleven species in the genus Calectasia. It was described as a new species in 2001 by K.W. Dixon and R.L. Barrett from a specimen collected on the Coorow-Greenhead Road. The specific epithet (browneana) refers to the owners of a property where the species is found and "who have endeavoured to conserve high conservation value kwongan vegetation on their land".

Distribution and habitat
This species of blue tinsel lily is uncommon and found in only two, separate areas of the south-west of Western Australia - the Coorow-Eneabba region and near Kalbarri. It grows in white-grey sand over laterite in kwongan vegetation.

Conservation status
Calectasia browneana is classified as "Priority Two" by the Western Australian government Department of Parks and Wildlife meaning that is poorly known and from one or a few locations.

References

browneana
Endemic flora of Western Australia
Commelinids of Australia
Plants described in 2001
Taxa named by Gregory John Keighery
Taxa named by Russell Lindsay Barrett